Leizhou or Luichew Min is a branch of Min Chinese spoken in Leizhou city, Xuwen County, Mazhang District, most parts of Suixi County and also spoken inside of the linguistically diverse Xiashan District. In the classification of Yuan Jiahua, it was included in the Southern Min group, though it has low intelligibility with other Southern Min varieties.  In the classification of Li Rong, used by the Language Atlas of China, it was treated as a separate Min subgroup.  Hou Jingyi combined it with Hainanese in a Qiong–Lei group.

Phonology
Leizhou Min has 17 initials, 47 rimes and 8 tones.

Initials

Rimes

Tones
Leizhou has six tones, which are reduced to two in checked syllables.

See also

 Taiwanese Hokkien
 Teochew dialect
 List of Chinese dialects

References

Běijīng dàxué zhōngguóyǔyánwénxuéxì yǔyánxué jiàoyánshì. (1989) Hànyǔ fāngyīn zìhuì. Běijīng: Wénzìgǎigé chūbǎnshè.(北京大學中國語言文學系語言學教研室. 1989. 漢語方音字匯. 北京: 文字改革出版社)
Norman, Jerry. [1988] (2002). Chinese. Cambridge, England: CUP 
Yuán, jiāhuá (1989). Hànyǔ fāngyán gàiyào (An introduction to Chinese dialects). Beijing, China: Wénzì gǎigé chūbǎnshè. (袁家驊. 1989. 漢語方言概要. 北京:文字改革出版社.)
Zhū, yuèmíng. (2005) "Léizhōuhuà yú Pǔtōnghuà bǐjiàoyīnxì yánjiū" (Comparative phonological studies on the Leizhou dialect and Putonghua) Yúnnán shīfàndàxué xuébào (zhéxué shèhuìkēxué bǎn) (Yunnan Normal University Journal (philosophy and social sciences)): vol.37 no. 5 p. 133-136. (朱月明. 2005. "雷州話與普通話音系比較研究" 《雲南師範大學學報 (哲學社會科學版)》: 第 37 卷 第 5 期 頁133-136)

Further reading

External links
 Cantonese and other dialects (in Chinese)
 Classification of Northern Min Dialects from Glossika

Min Chinese